The Velocette KSS is a British motorcycle made by Velocette.  The final development of the K series (the K stood for Camshaft (the owners of the company were originally German) and the SS for Super Sports) The KSS remained in production in various forms until 1948.

Development

A production roadster motorcycle, the KSS was modified with a racing clutch and tuned to achieve 90 mph around the Isle of Man TT course, largely due to the excellent handling.  Important improvements included the positive-stop foot-operated gear change from the Velocette KTT production racing version.  

In 1936 Velocette developed the KSS Mk II, which had a Velocette MKV KTT  based chassis and a new engine with an alloy cylinder head.  A touring version, the Velocette KTS was also developed with 19-inch wheels and matching mudguards.

Racing success
Alec Bennett won the 1926 Junior TT a full ten minutes ahead of the next rider.  He had a second place in 1927 and won again in 1928 and 1929.

See also
 Velocette
 Velocette Spring-heeled Jack

References

External links
 Original Velocette KSS sales brochure

KSS
Motorcycles introduced in the 1920s